Merkerson is a surname. Notable people with the surname include:

Da'Mon Merkerson (born 1989), American football player
Ron Merkerson (born 1975), American football player
S. Epatha Merkerson (born 1952), American actress

See also
Merson